The 1960 NAIA men's basketball tournament was held in March at Municipal Auditorium in Kansas City, Missouri. The 23rd annual NAIA basketball tournament featured 32 teams playing in a single-elimination format.

The pivotal game in this year's tournament was in the semifinals round when #4 Westminster College knocked off the three time defending national champions #1 Tennessee State University. This ended the 18 tournament win streak. As of 2017, it is still the tournament's longest win streak. Tennessee State would then play in the 3rd-place game where they easily defeated William Jewell College 100-65. (William Jewell's highest finish in the DI tournament, as of 2010).

Westminster went to the championship game and was defeated by Southwest Texas State 44-66. The Bobcats finish with their first national championship, after being in the NAIA Final Four two previous times, 1952, 1959, both finishing 3rd.

Awards and honors
Many of the records set by the 1960 tournament have been broken, and many of the awards were established much later:
Leading scorer: est. 1963
Leading rebounder: est. 1963
Player of the Year: est. 1994
Most consecutive tournament victories; record ends: 18 overall; 3 in 1960, Tennessee State, 1957-58-59-60
Top single-game performances: Charles Sharp, 16th, Southwest Texas State vs. Wisconsin-Oshkosh, In that game Sharp scored 15 field goals and 14 free throws, totaling 44 points.
All-time leading scorer; first appearance: Hershell West, 15th Grambling (La.) (1960,61,63), 13 games, 116 field goals, 37 free throws, 269 total points, 20.7 average per game.
All-time leading scorer; final appearance: Charles Sharp, 5th Southwest Texas State (1957,59,60) 12 games, 118 field goals, 69 free throws, 305 total points, 25.4 average per game.

1960 NAIA bracket

  * denotes each overtime.

3rd-place game
The third-place game featured the losing teams from the national semifinalist to determine 3rd and 4th places in the tournament. This game was played until 1988.

See also
 1960 NCAA University Division basketball tournament
 1960 NCAA College Division basketball tournament

References

NAIA Men's Basketball Championship
Tournament
NAIA men's basketball tournament
NAIA men's basketball tournament